Laurel High School may refer to:

Laurel High School, in Los Alamitos, California
Laurel High School (Delaware)
Laurel High School (Maryland)
Laurel High School (Mississippi)
Laurel High School (Montana)
Laurel High School (Wisconsin)
Laurel High School (Knoxville, Tennessee), a high school in Knox County, Tennessee

See also
North Laurel High School and South Laurel High School, Laurel County Public Schools, Kentucky